The 1953 Vicksburg, Mississippi tornado was a deadly F5 tornado that struck Vicksburg, Mississippi on Saturday, December 5, 1953. A total of 38 people were killed, 270 others were injured, and damages were estimated at $25 million (1953 USD) in damage. It remains the fifth-deadliest tornado to affect the U.S. state of Mississippi, behind the 1840 Great Natchez Tornado, the 1936 tornado in Tupelo, the 1971 tornado in Cary, and the 1966 tornado in Jackson. It is one of just four F5 tornadoes recorded in Mississippi since 1950.

Background
On December 5, 1953, as a warm front retreated northward across Mississippi, temperatures in the warm sector rose steadily. By sunrise, temperatures were already in the low 50s °F—ten to fifteen degrees above average–despite overcast conditions. Meanwhile, favorable wind shear arrived to promote the growth of severe thunderstorms, along with the conditions necessary for tornadogenesis. At 1:30 p.m. CST (19:30 UTC), the Severe Local Storms Unit of the United States Weather Bureau in Washington, D.C., released a severe weather bulletin indicating the likelihood of tornado-producing storms over portions of East Texas, southern Arkansas, northern Louisiana, and western Mississippi.

Tornado event
The destructive tornado may have first touched down over easternmost Madison Parish, Louisiana, crossed the Mississippi River, and felled trees on DeSoto Island. However, official records indicate that the tornado first developed over the Yazoo River in Warren County, Mississippi. As it entered Vicksburg, the tornado, which followed heavy rain, destroyed electrical services to the city, and it also initiated several fires. Buildings were "shambles" along four city blocks, and the downtown business district was adversely affected. Many automobiles were submerged by debris. The tornado damaged or destroyed 937 buildings, while nearly 1,300 people lost their homes. A total of 12 blocks of the city's business district were affected by the tornado, and fires also burned cotton.  In total, 270 people received injuries, and total damages approached $25 million.  The tornado is officially rated F5 on the Fujita scale; however, the rating is questionable, since the tornado demolished frail structures. Tornado researcher Thomas P. Grazulis rated the tornado F4.

Aftermath and recovery
The tornado broke the city's gas line, which remained out of service after repairs. Residents were forced to go without cooked food even as temperatures dropped to  overnight on December 6. The tornado also disproved a persistent myth that its proximity to a river protected Vicksburg from tornadoes.

See also

1966 Candlestick Park tornado outbreak – A small, but significant outbreak that produced a powerful F5 tornado that devastated portions of Jackson, Mississippi
2011 Philadelphia, Mississippi tornado – First of two EF5 tornadoes in Mississippi during the 2011 Super Outbreak
2011 Smithville, Mississippi tornado – Second of two EF5 tornadoes in Mississippi during the 2011 Super Outbreak
List of F5 and EF5 tornadoes
List of tornadoes and tornado outbreaks
List of North American tornadoes and tornado outbreaks

References

V
V
V
1953 in the United States
1953 in Mississippi
December 1953 events in the United States